An election petition is a petition challenging the result of an election to a United Kingdom Parliament constituency. The Parliamentary Elections Act 1868 transferred the jurisdiction for considering petitions from the House of Commons to the High Court of Justice. The following table lists all those petitions which subsequently came to trial.

Glossary (by columns)
 Election: The year of a general election, or the full date of a by-election.
 Constituency:  The parliamentary constituency concerned.
 Petitioner: The person or people bringing the petition and challenging the election.
 Respondent: The defendant in the case. The elected MP was always a respondent; if procedural irregularity was alleged, the Returning Officer could be added.
Allegation
  'Bribery, etc.' : It was routine for election petitions in the 19th century brought on grounds of bribery also to make accusations of treating and undue influence. Some petitions were apparently written using boilerplate text.
 Personation: One person knowingly voting in the name of another.
 Scrutiny of votes: A process where the votes were recounted, the eligibility of each voter was checked, and ineligible votes struck off.
 Treating: The act of giving free food and drink with intent to persuade the recipient to vote for a particular candidate.
 Undue influence: Any attempt to win votes by threats.
Result
 : The court upheld the election, and declared the sitting Member the rightful winner. One of four possible outcomes of a petition trial; coloured green in the table.
 : The court found that the person who was elected had not won the election, but that another candidate had the majority of lawful votes, and therefore declared the other candidate elected. One of four possible outcomes of a petition trial; coloured red in the table.
 : The court found that the election had not been conducted fairly, and annulled the result. This meant that the seat was vacant and another election had to be held to fill it. One of four possible outcomes of a petition trial; coloured purple in the table.
 : The judges allowed the petitioner to withdraw the case, and the election result stood. As petitioners might be induced to withdraw a petition by a further act of corruption, the judges had to give permission on the basis that they were satisfied no corrupt consideration was involved. One of four possible outcomes of a petition trial; coloured yellow in the table.
Reason
 Agent: Anyone acting directly or indirectly on behalf of the candidates; not merely the election agent but anyone employed by them. Many cases turned on whether a person proved to have carried out illegal activity was an agent (voiding the election) or was acting independently.
 Recriminatory case: Where a petition was presented by a defeated candidate claiming to have been the rightful winner (and not that the election be declared void), it was open to the Respondent to bring forward accusations against their election campaign.
 Relief: If certain aspects of election law have been broken through inadvertence, it is possible for those involved to be relieved from the consequences of breaking the law. The effect of relief is as if the breach of the law never occurred.
 Special case: Where the dispute in an election petition concerned the law and not the facts, it was referred to three Judges of the High Court (England and Wales), the Court of Session (Scotland) or the High Court of Northern Ireland.
References
 Day: Day, Samuel H. Election cases in 1892 and 1893: being a collection of the points of law and practice arising out of the parliamentary election petitions in those years, together with reports of the judgments. London: Stevens and Sons, 1894.
 Fitzgerald: The judgments of Mr Baron Fitzgerald, in the cases of the election petitions for the boroughs of Limerick, Belfast, and Cashel. 1869.
 HCP: House of Commons Papers. Until 1911 the House of Commons published the judgments of most election courts in the sessional papers. The year of the session is given and the number of the paper, followed by the relevant pages in the case where multiple judgments are in a single paper.
 O'M & H: O'Malley, Edwin L.; Hardcastle, Henry. Reports of the Decisions of the Judges for the trial of Election Petitions in England and Ireland as pursuant to The Parliamentary Elections Act 1868. London: Stevens & Haynes. 7 vols, 1870–1929. 1870: Volume I (Petitions 1869) • 1875: Volume II (Petitions 1870 – 6 August 1874) • 1881: Volume III: (Petitions 8 August 1874 – 2 December 1880) • [Vols. 4-7 (1893, 1910 & 1929) seem to be Public Domain only in the US] e.g. 1 O'M & H 281 = Volume 1, p. 281

Election Petitions tried from 1868 to 1883

Election Petitions tried since 1883

The Corrupt and Illegal Practices Prevention Act 1883 substantially altered and strengthened the law in respect of election offences.

Petitions withdrawn before trial

In some cases a petition was presented and security for costs was given, but the petitioner applied to withdraw the petition before trial.

 1868: Athlone. John Stamforth v. John James Ennis.
 1868: Boston. Thomas Mason Jones v. John Wingfield Malcolm and Thomas Collins.
 1868: Bradford (No. 3). Samuel Storey and Thomas Garnett v. Rt. Hon. William Edward Forster.
 1868: Cambridge. Daniel Lloyd and John Brown v. Robert Richard Torrens and William Fowler.
 1868: Carlow Borough. Richard Boardman v. William Fagan.
 1868: Christchurch. Harcourt Pauncefoot Popham v. Edmund Haviland Burke.
 1868: Derbyshire, Northern (No. 1). William Longsdon and others v. Augustus Peter Arkwright.
 1868: Derbyshire, Northern (No. 2). John Broxup Coates and another v. Lord George Henry Cavendish.
 1868: Dublin City (No. 2). Hon. David Robert Plunket v. Jonathan Pim.
 1868: Dumfriesshire. George Gustavus Walker v. Sir Sydney Hedley Waterlow.
 1868: Durham, Southern. John Cary Hendy and William Watson Brown v. Joseph W. Pease and Frederick Blackett Beaumont.
 1868: Enniskillen. George Kittson and Thomas Johnston v. John Henry, Viscount Crichton.
 1868: Gloucester. Francis Niblett and others v. William Philip Price and Charles James Monk.
 1868: Hampshire, Southern (No. 1). John Watkins Drew v. Lord Henry Scott.
 1868: Hampshire, Southern (No. 2). Charles Castleman and Arthur Frederick Naghton v. Rt. Hon. William Francis Cowper.
 1868: The Hartlepools. William Gray and others v. Ralph Ward Jackson.
 1868: Horsham (No. 1). Charles Spencer Scrace Dickins and another v. Robert Henry Hurst.
 1868: Kingston upon Hull. Joseph Walker Pease and others v. Charles Morgan Norwood and James Clay.
 1868: Pembroke. William Hughes v. Thomas Meyrick.
 1868: Preston. Joseph Toulmin and Richard Pemberton v. Edward Hermon and Sir Thomas George Fermor Hesketh, Bt.
 1868: Shrewsbury. Thomas Young and James Coch v. James Figgins.
 1868: Sligo County (No. 1). John Hannon and James Casey v. Sir Robert Gore Booth, Bt.
 1868: Sligo County (No. 2). Henry Griffith v. Denis Maurice O'Connor.
 1868: Stockport (No. 1). James Walton and William Jones v. John Benjamin Smith.
 1868: Stockport (No. 2). Ephraim Hallam and John Eskrigge v. William Tipping.
 1868: Taunton (No. 1). John Dyke and William Oaten v. Alexander Charles Barclay.
 1868: Taunton (No. 3). John Dyke and William Oaten v. Alexander Charles Barclay.
 1868: Thirsk. Frederic Bell and others v. Sir William Payne Gallwey, Bt.
 1868: Warwickhire, Southern. William Colley and others v. John Hardy.
 1868: Wick Burghs. Edmund Beatty Lockyer v. George Loch.
 1868: York (No. 1). T. H. Gladstone v. James Lowther.
 1868: York (No. 2). John Burrill v. Joshua Proctor Brown-Westhead.
 24 April 1869: Brecon. David Evans, David Williams, Rees Price and Edward Williams v. Edward Hyde Villiers, Lord Hyde.
 6 February 1872: Kerry. Thomas Duckett Maybury and Maurice Harman v. Rowland Ponsonby Blennerhassett.
 16 April 1873: Tyrone. John William Ellison Macartney v. Capt. Hon. Henry William Lowry Corry.
 1874: Ayr Burghs. Edward Henry John Craufurd v. Sir William James Montgomery Cuninghame, Bt.
 1874: Durham, Southern. Henry Edward Surtees, William Culley Stobart and George Anthony Leaton Blenkinsopp v. Joseph Whitwell Pease and Frederick Edward Blackett Beaumont.
 1874: Isle of Wight. Hon. A.E.M. Ashley v. A.B. Cochrane.
 1874: Kerry. Maurice James O'Connell, James Egan, John Harrison, and Maurice Walsh v. Henry Arthur Herbert and Rowland Ponsonby Blennerhassett.
 1874: Kidderminster. H.R. Willis and another v. Albert Grant.
 1874: Leitrim. Francis O'Beirne v. William Richard Ormsby Gore (The trial judge refused permission for the petition to be listed for trial).
 1874: Pembroke. G. White v. Edward James Reed.
 1874: Stockport. John Oldfield and James Kirk v. Charles Henry Hopwood and Frederick Pennington.
 26 May 1874: Poole. Sir I.B. Guest, Bt. v. Hon. A.M. Ashley.
 22 June 1874: Durham, Northern. Edward Pickering and William Williams v. Charles Mark Palmer.
 1880: Bandon. John Corcoran v. Percy B. Bernard.
 1880: Bury St Edmunds. W.H. Rushbrooke and another v. J.A. Hardcastle.
 1880: Cheshire, Western. J. Ledsham and another v. W.F.Tollemache and another.
 1880: Colchester. Thomas May, John Lay, Alfred Robert Staines, James Watson, William Moseley Tabrum and Frederick Abraham Cole v. William Willis.
 1880: Dunbartonshire. John William Burns v. Archibald Orr-Ewing.
 1880: Hereford. J.B. Preece and others v. J. Pulley and another.
 1880: Horsham. T.W. Cowan and others v. Sir H. Fletcher.
 1880: Leominster. S.W. Johnson and another v. J. Rankin.
 1880: Londonderry City. John Boyle and William Conaghan v. Charles Edward Lewis.
 1880: Londonderry County. James Forrest and Thomas Walker v. Rt. Hon. Hugh Law and Sir Thomas McClure, Bt.
 1880: Nottingham. P. Isaac and another v. C. Seely and another. Although the Judges passed on a letter reporting rumours that the Respondents had paid £10,000 to secure the withdrawal of the petition, they stated that they had no reason to believe it to be true.
 1880: Stroud. W. Smith v. W.J. Stenton and another.
 1880: Wicklow. William Wentworth FitzWilliam Dick v. James Carlisle McCoan and Howard Brooke.
 1880: Wilton. S.B. Wilson v. Hon. S. Herbert.
 1892: Halifax. Alfred Arnold v. William Rawson Shaw.
 1892: Lichfield. Sir John Swinburne, Bt. v. Major Darwin.
 1895: Durham. Arthur Ralph Douglas Elliot v. Matthew Fowler.
 1895: Edinburgh, South. Robert Burn and Joseph Train Gray v. Robert Cox.
 1895: Southampton (No. 1). Sir Francis Henry Evans v. Tankerville Chamberlayne and Sir John Stephen Barrington Simeon, Bt.
 1900: Wick Burghs. James Edward Harper and others v. Arthur Bignold. (The petitioner was substituted by Thomas Charles Hunter Hedderwick.)
 14 July 1988: Kensington. Phylip Andrew David Hobson v. John Dudley Fishburn. Ordered to be struck out on the motion of the respondent: the petitioner was aged 19 so he could not lodge a petition claiming to have been elected, as the Parliamentary Elections Act 1695 set the minimum age at 21. Hobson attempted to withdraw the petition and substitute a new one in which he would petition as an elector, but he was out of time to do so.
 2015: Mid Bedfordshire. Timothy Scott Ireland v Nadine Vanessa Dorries. Ordered to be struck out on the motion of the respondent: the petition was not served on the respondent according to law as it was delivered to her constituency office rather than her home address.
 6 June 2019: Peterborough. Michael Greene v. Lisa Forbes.

See also

 Corrupt practices
 Election court
 Election fraud
 Parliamentary Elections Corrupt Practices Act 1885

References

Further reading

 Erskine May: Parliamentary Practice
  Updated editions were published in 1880 and 1885 by the same publisher.
 
 
  Second edition 1891. Third edition 1920 ed. by Oscar F. Dowson. Fourth edition 1929 ed. by O. F. Dowson, H. W. Wightwick and C. N. T. Jeffreys. Fifth edition 1949. Sixth edition under the title "Parker's Election Agent and Returning Officer" ed. by H. W. Wightwick and H. W. Woolaston, 1959. Seventh edition under the title "Parker's Conduct of Parliamentary Elections", 1970. New edition under the title "Parker's law and conduct of elections", 1996 by Richard Clayton.
 
  Second edition in 1895, third edition 1905, published by the same publisher.
  Second edition 1910; third edition 1922.
 
  Second edition 1955; third edition under the title "Schofield's Election Law", 1984 ed. by A.J. Little.
 
 

Case law lists by court
Election law in the United Kingdom
Election legislation